Armour High School is the only high school in Armour, South Dakota.  It is the only high school in Armour School District 21–1, which also includes an elementary and a middle school.  Armour High School's athletic teams were formerly nicknamed the "Packers" and played in Class B of the South Dakota High School Activities Association.

Armour plays all sports (as of the 2007–08 school year) in conjunction with Tripp-Delmont High School; these teams are known as the Tripp-Delmont/Armour Nighthawks and play in Class 9AA (American Football) and Class B in all other sports (boys' and girls' basketball, volleyball,  and boys' and girls' track & field). Tripp-Delmont High School plays golf independently.

References

External links
Armour School District website

Public high schools in South Dakota
Schools in Douglas County, South Dakota